Thommie Bayer (Thomas Bayer-Heer, born 22 April 1953) is a German writer, musician and painter.

Bayer was born in Esslingen am Neckar, near Stuttgart (where he attended school). From 1972 to 1978, he studied at the Stuttgart State Academy of Art and Design.

From 1974, he was a musician, first with the duo Thommie und Tomaske, then with his own band, the Thommie Bayer Band. He often shared the stage with friends Thomas C. Breuer and Bernhard Lassahn. His most successful hit was in 1979 with "Der letzte Cowboy kommt aus Gütersloh".

He continued playing music in the 1980s, having successes with "Alles geregelt" and "Rita", but concentrated on writing.

Select discography
 Du wartest auf den Regentropfen, 1976 (LP)
 Silchers Rache, 1978 (LP)
 Abenteuer, 1979 (LP)
 Feindliches Gebiet, 1980 (LP)
 Kamikaze Bodenpersonal, 1981 (LP)
 Paradies, 1982 (LP)
 Was ist los?, 1983 (LP)
 Alles geregelt, 1984 (LP)
 Fliegender Teppich von Gleis 8, 1988 (CD)
 Das blaue Wunder, 1996 (CD)
 Cowboys und Indianer, 1998 (CD)

Literary works
 Wir, die wir mitten im Leben stehen, mit beiden Beinen in der Scheiße, Trier 1977 (with Thomas C. Breuer)
 Über Menschen & unter Menschen, Trier 1979 (with Thomas C. Breuer)
 Eine Überdosis Liebe, Reinbek bei Hamburg 1985
 Einsam, zweisam, dreisam, Reinbek bei Hamburg 1987
 Die frohe Botschaft, abgestaubt und frisch gefaßt, Zürich 1989
 Sellavie ist kein Gemüse, Weinheim [u.a.] 1990
 Es ist nicht alles Kunst, was glänzt ..., Weinheim [u.a.] 1991
 Das Herz ist eine miese Gegend, Reinbek bei Hamburg 1991
 Spatz in der Hand, Frankfurt am Main 1992
 Sponto, Carla, Mike und Bobby McGee, Bielefeld 1992
 Der Himmel fängt über dem Boden an, Frankfurt am Main 1994
 Irgendwie das Meer, Frankfurt am Main 1995
 Der langsame Tanz, Frankfurt am Main 1998
 Andrea und Marie, München 2001
 Das Aquarium, Frankfurt am Main 2002
 Die gefährliche Frau, München 2004
 Singvogel, München 2005
 Eine kurze Geschichte vom Glück, München 2007
 Aprilwetter, München 2009
 Fallers große Liebe, München 2010
 Heimweh nach dem Ort, an dem ich bin, München 2011

See also
 List of German painters

References

1953 births
Living people
People from Esslingen am Neckar
20th-century German male musicians
21st-century German male musicians
20th-century German painters
20th-century German male artists
German male painters
21st-century German painters
21st-century German male artists
Writers from Baden-Württemberg
20th-century German male writers
21st-century German male writers